Indrān parish is an administrative unit of the Lubāna Municipality, Latvia.

References 

Parishes of Latvia